Shashalee Forbes (also Sashalee Forbes; born 10 May 1996) is a Jamaican athlete who specialises in the sprint. She participated at the 2016 Summer Olympics.

Personal bests

Outdoor

References

External links

1996 births
Living people
Jamaican female sprinters
Athletes (track and field) at the 2016 Summer Olympics
Olympic athletes of Jamaica
Olympic silver medalists for Jamaica
Olympic silver medalists in athletics (track and field)
Medalists at the 2016 Summer Olympics
World Athletics Championships athletes for Jamaica
World Athletics Championships medalists
Universiade medalists in athletics (track and field)
Competitors at the 2018 Central American and Caribbean Games
Central American and Caribbean Games gold medalists for Jamaica
Universiade gold medalists for Jamaica
Athletes (track and field) at the 2019 Pan American Games
Pan American Games competitors for Jamaica
Central American and Caribbean Games medalists in athletics
Olympic female sprinters
21st-century Jamaican women